Shaban Kandi (also Romanized as Sha‘bān Kandī) is a village in Baranduzchay-ye Jonubi Rural District, in the Central District of Urmia County, West Azerbaijan Province, Iran. At the 2006 census, its population was 57, in 15 families.

References 

Populated places in Urmia County